These are biblical figures unambiguously identified in contemporary sources according to scholarly consensus. Biblical figures that are identified in artifacts of questionable authenticity, for example the Jehoash Inscription and the bullae of Baruch ben Neriah, or who are mentioned in ancient but non-contemporary documents, such as David and Balaam, are excluded from this list.

Hebrew Bible
 

Although the first mention of the name 'Israel' in archaeology dates to the 13th century BC, contemporary information on the Israelite nation prior to the 9th century BC is extremely sparse. In the following centuries a small number of local Hebrew documents, mostly seals and bullae, mention biblical characters, but more extensive information is available in the royal inscriptions from neighbouring kingdoms, particularly Babylon, Assyria and Egypt.

Deuterocanonicals 

While the deuterocanon describes events between the eighth and second centuries BCE, most historically identifiable people mentioned in the deuterocanon lived around the time of the Maccabean Revolt (167–160 BCE), during which Judea was part of the Seleucid Empire. Coins featuring the names of rulers had become widespread and many of them were inscribed with the year number in the Seleucid era, allowing them to be dated precisely.

First-hand information comes also from the Greek historian Polybius (c. 200 – c. 118 BCE), whose Histories covers much of the same period as the Books of Maccabees, and from Greek and Babylonian inscriptions. Josephus also discusses the Maccabean Revolt in some detail in Jewish Antiquities Book XII, although the Greek version of the book of 1 Maccabees was one of Josephus's main sources, so Antiquities is considered by some scholars a circular reference rather than truly independent confirmation.

New Testament

By far the most important and most detailed sources for first-century Jewish history are the works of Jewish historian Flavius Josephus (37 – c. 100 AD). These books mention many of the same prominent political figures as the New Testament books and are crucial for understanding the historical background of the emergence of Christianity. Josephus also mentions Jesus and the execution of John the Baptist although he was not a contemporary of either. Apart from Josephus, information about some New Testament figures comes from Roman historians such as Tacitus and Suetonius and from ancient coins and inscriptions.

Persons mentioned in the Gospels

Persons mentioned in the New Testament outside the Gospels

Tentatively identified

These are Biblical figures for which tentative but likely identifications have been found in contemporary sources based on matching names and credentials. The possibility of coincidental matching of names cannot be ruled out however.

Hebrew Bible (Protocanonical Old Testament)

 Ahaziah/Amaziah, King of Judah. The Tel Dan Stele contains, according to many scholars, an account by a Syrian king (probably Hazael), claiming to have slain "[Ahaz]iahu, son of [... kin]g of the house of David", who reigned c. 850 – 849 BCE. However, an alternative view, which dates the inscription half a century later, is that the name should be reconstructed as '[Amaz]iahu', who reigned c. 796–767 BCE.
 Asaiah, servant of king Josiah (2 Kings 22:12). A seal with the text Asayahu servant of the king probably belonged to him.
 Azaliah son of Meshullam, scribe in the Temple in Jerusalem: Mentioned in 2 Kings 22:3 and 2 Chronicles 34:8. A bulla reading "belonging to Azaliahu son of Meshullam." is likely to be his, according to archaeologist Nahman Avigad.
 Azariah son of Hilkiah and grandfather of Ezra: Mentioned in 1 Chronicles 6:13,14; 9:11 and Ezra 7:1. A bulla reading Azariah son of Hilkiah is likely to be his, according to Tsvi Schneider.<ref name="Six">Schneider, Tsvi, Six Biblical Signatures: Seals and seal impressions of six biblical personages recovered''', Biblical Archaeology Review, July/August 1991</ref>
 Baalis king of Ammon is mentioned in Jeremiah 40:14. In 1984 an Ammonite seal, dated to c. 600 BCE, was excavated in Tell El-`Umeiri, Jordan that reads "belonging to Milkomor, the servant of Baalisha". Identification of 'Baalisha' with the biblical Baalis is likely, but it is not currently known if there was only one Ammonite king of that name.
 Ben-Hadad I, was identified by William F. Albright as the "Bar-Hadad, son of [...], king of Aram" mentioned on the Melqart stele,  however, several other scholars, such as Kenneth Kitchen, dispute this identification, as the stele's inscription is damaged and there is no outside evidence supporting this conclusion.
 David, or more accurately his eponymous royal house, is mentioned in the Tel Dan Stele, see above entry for Ahaziah.
 Darius II of Persia, is mentioned by the contemporary historian Xenophon of Athens, in the Elephantine Papyri, and other sources. 'Darius the Persian', mentioned in Nehemiah 12:22, is probably Darius II, although some scholars identify him with Darius I or Darius III.Freedman, David N., The Unity of the Hebrew Bible, University of Michigan Press, 1993, p. 93 
 Gedaliah son of Ahikam, governor of Judah. A seal impression with the name 'Gedaliah who is over the house' is commonly identified with Gedaliah, son of Ahikam.
 Gedaliah son of Pashhur, an opponent of Jeremiah. A bulla bearing his name was found in the City of David
 Gemariah (son of Shaphan), son of Shaphan the scribe. A bulla was found with the text "To Gemaryahu ben Shaphan". This may have been the same person as "Gemariah son of Shaphan the scribe" mentioned in Jeremiah 36:10,12.
 Geshem (Gusham) the Arab, mentioned in Nehemia 6:1,6 is likely the same person as Gusham, king of Kedar, found in two inscriptions in Dedan and Tell el-Mashkutah (near the Suez Canal)
 Hilkiah, high priest in the Temple in Jerusalem: Mentioned throughout 2 Kings 22:8–23:24 and 2 Chronicles 34:9–35:8 as well as in 1 Chronicles 6:13; 9:11 and Ezra 7:1. Hilkiah in extra-biblical sources is attested by the clay bulla naming a Hilkiah as the father of an Azariah, and by the seal reading Hanan son of Hilkiah the priest.
 Isaiah, In February 2018 archaeologist Eilat Mazar announced that she and her team had discovered a small seal impression which reads "[belonging] to Isaiah nvy" (could be reconstructed and read as "[belonging] to Isaiah the prophet") during the Ophel excavations, just south of the Temple Mount in Jerusalem. The tiny bulla was found "only 10 feet away" from where an intact bulla bearing the inscription "[belonging] to King Hezekiah of Judah" was discovered in 2015 by the same team. Although the name "Isaiah" in Paleo-Hebrew alphabet is unmistakable, the damage on the bottom left part of the seal causes difficulties in confirming the word "prophet" or a common Hebrew name "Navi", casting some doubts whether this seal really belongs to the prophet Isaiah.
 Jehoram, King of Israel (c. 852 – 841 BCE) is probably mentioned in the Tel Dan inscription. According to the usual interpretation, the author of the text claims to have slain both Ahaziah of Judah and "[Jeho]ram". However, some scholars, reconstructing the pieces of the stela differently, do not see "[..]ram" as the name of an Israelite king.
 Jehucal son of Shelemiah, an opponent of Jeremiah. Archaeologists excavated a bulla with his name, but some scholars question the dating of the seal to the time of Jeremiah.
 Jerahmeel, prince of Judah. A bulla bearing his name was found.
 Jeroboam (II), king of Israel. A seal belonging to 'Shema, servant of Jeroboam', probably refers to king Jeroboam II, although some scholars think it was Jeroboam I.
 Jezebel, wife of king Ahab of Israel. A seal was found that may bear her name, but the dating and identification with the biblical Jezebel is a subject of debate among scholars.
 Josiah, king of Judah. Three seals were found that may have belonged to his son Eliashib.
A clay bulla dated to the middle of the seventh or beginning of the sixth century B.C was found in March 2019 during the Givati Parking Lot dig excavation in the City of the David area of Jerusalem bearing the inscription, "(belonging) to Nathan-melech, servant of the king."2,600-year old seal discovered in City of David. Jerusalem Post. April 1, 2019
 Nergal-sharezer, king of Babylon is probably identical to an official of Nebuchadnezzar II mentioned in Jeremiah 39:3, 13. A record of his war with Syria was found on a tablet from the 'Neo-Babylonian Chronicle texts'.
 Seraiah son of Neriah. He was the brother of Baruch. Nahman Avigad identified him as the owner of a seal with the name " to Seriahu/Neriyahu".

 Shebna (or Shebaniah), royal steward of Hezekiah: only the last two letters of a name (hw) survive on the so-called Shebna lintel, but the title of his position ("over the house"  of the king) and the date indicated by the script style, have inclined many scholars to identify the person it refers to with Shebna.
She has been identified with the owner of a seal reading “Belonging to Shelomith, maidservant of Elnathan the governor”.
 Sheshonq I, Pharaoh of Egypt, is normally identified with king Shishaq in the Hebrew Bible. The account of Shishaq's invasion in the 5th year of Rehoboam (1 Kings 14:25–28) is thought to correspond to an inscription found at Karnak of Shoshenq's campaign into Palestine. However, a minority of scholars reject this identification.
 Tou/Toi, king of Hamath. Several scholars have argued that Tou/Toi, mentioned in 2 Samuel 8:9 and 1 Chronicles 18:9, is identical with a certain 'Taita', king of 'Palistin', known from inscriptions found in northern Syria.The History of King David in Light of New Epigraphic and Archeological Data, (link), website of University of Haifa, citing publications by Gershon Galil from 2013-2014 However, others have challenged this identification based on linguistic analysis and the uncertain dating of king Taita.
 Uzziah, king of Judah. The writings of Tiglath-Pileser III may refer to him, but this identification is disputed. There is also an inscription that refers to his bones, but it dates from the 1st century CE.
 Zedekiah, son of Hananiah (Jeremiah 36:12). A seal was found of "Zedekiah son of Hanani", identification is likely, but uncertain.

Deuterocanonicals or biblical apocrypha

New Testament

 'The Egyptian', who was according to Acts 21:38 the instigator of a rebellion, also appears to be mentioned by Josephus, although this identification is uncertain.Frankfurter, David, Pilgrimage and Holy Space in Late Antique Egypt , Brill, 1998, p. 206
 Joanna, wife of Chuza: An ossuary has been discovered bearing the inscription, "Johanna, granddaughter of Theophilus, the High Priest.", It is unclear if this was the same Joanna since Johanna was the fifth most popular woman's name in Jewish Palestine. 
 Sergius Paulus was proconsul of Cyprus (Acts 13:4–7), when Paul visited the island around 46–48 CE. Although several individuals with this name have been identified, no certain identification can be made. One Quintus Sergius Paulus, who was proconsul of Cyprus probably during the reign of Claudius (41–54 CE) is however compatible with the time and context of Luke's account.Bromiley, Geoffrey W. (ed.), The International Standard Bible Encyclopedia Vol. III: K–P  Wm. B. Eerdmans 1986, pp. 729–730 (entry Paulus, Sergius)
 Lysanias, was tetrarch of Abila around 28 CE, according to Luke (3:1). Because Josephus only mentions a Lysanias of Abila who was executed in 36 BCE, some scholars have considered this an error by Luke. However, one inscription from Abila, which is tentatively dated 14–29 CE, appears to record the existence of a later tetrarch called Lysanias.Morris, Leon, Luke: an introduction and commentary  Wm. B. Eerdmans 1988, p. 28
 Theudas.  The sole reference to Theudas presents a problem of chronology. In Acts of the Apostles, Gamaliel, a member of the sanhedrin, defends the apostles by referring to Theudas (Acts 5:36–8). The difficulty is that the rising of Theudas is here given as before that of Judas of Galilee, which is itself dated to the time of the taxation (c.'' 6–7 AD). Josephus, on the other hand, says that Theudas was 45 or 46, which is after Gamaliel is speaking, and long after Judas the Galilean.

See also
 Biblical archaeology
 Biblical figures
 Chronology of Jesus
 Historicity of the Bible
 List of artifacts significant to the Bible
 List of burial places of biblical figures
 List of people in both the Bible and the Quran

Notes

References

Bibliography
 
  (3 Volumes)
 
 
 

Ancient Israel and Judah
 
extra-biblical records
Biblical archaeology